Dekabriean Eldridge (born June 12, 1992), also credited as D.K. Eldridge, is an American professional basketball player who last played for Al-Nasr of the Libyan Division I Basketball League.

Professional career 
After finished college, Eldridge spent two seasons in Mexico. He played for the Correcaminos UAT Victoria of the Liga Nacional, and for the Garra Cañera de Navolato and the Frayles de Guasave of the CIBACOPA. On January 20, 2017, he signed for the Correcaminos. Over eight regular-season games, he averaged 21.2 points, 3.1 rebounds and 1.1 assists per game. On April 9, Eldridge signed for the Garra Cañera. Over 13 regular-season games he averaged 12.8 points, 4.5 rebounds and 2.2 assists per game.

On August 10, 2017, Eldridge signed a two-year contract with the Serbian team Dynamic Belgrade. On December 30, 2017, he parted ways with Dynamic.

References

External links 
D.K. Eldridge at realgm.com
 D.K. Eldridge at eurobasket.com

1992 births
Living people
African-American basketball players
American expatriate basketball people in Mexico
American expatriate basketball people in Serbia
Basketball League of Serbia players
Basketball players from Dallas
Correcaminos UAT Victoria players
Frayles de Guasave players
Garra Cañera de Navolato players
KK Dynamic players
New Mexico State Aggies men's basketball players
NMJC Thunderbirds men's basketball players
American men's basketball players
Shooting guards
21st-century African-American sportspeople